Bülent Cevahir (born 13 February 1992) is a Turkish footballer who plays as a defender for Boluspor.

Professional career
Cevahir made his Süper Lig debut on 30 January 2011 with Manisaspor jersey.

References

External links
 
 
 

1992 births
People from Selçuk
Living people
Turkish footballers
Turkey B international footballers
Turkey under-21 international footballers
Association football midfielders
Manisaspor footballers
Balıkesirspor footballers
Yeni Malatyaspor footballers
Fatih Karagümrük S.K. footballers
Hatayspor footballers
Boluspor footballers
TFF First League players
Süper Lig players